Mordella leucographa is a species of beetle in the genus Mordella of the family Mordellidae, which is part of the superfamily Tenebrionoidea. It was discovered in 1891. They are found in Guatemala, Nicaragua, and Panama.

References

Beetles described in 1891
leucographa